By the end of 2006 there were about 15 hybrid vehicles from various car makers available in the U.S. By May 2007 Toyota sold its first million hybrids and had sold a total of two million hybrids at the end of August 2009.

Comparisons
Below is a comparison of the Toyota hybrid models.

 Note: Miles per gallon estimates are those provided by the United States Environmental Protection Agency (EPA) and are the 2008 revision of the original numbers.
 Hybrid access to US HOV lanes varies by US state.  Factors can include total/average miles per gallon rating from the EPA, type of technology used, and/or date of vehicle registration with the relevant state authorities.  (Several states have begun restricting HOV lane access by hybrid and clean-fuel vehicles due to crowding.)
 Traction battery power is the amount of power available from the electric portion of the powertrain without the aid of the internal combustion engine (ICE).  This is generally limited by the traction battery rather than the electric motor(s).

See also
Hybrid Synergy Drive
Hybrid electric vehicles in the United States
List of hybrid vehicles

Notes

References

External links
about.com hybrid comparison
allabouthybridcars comparison
Hybrid Synergy Drive movie from Toyota 
United States Environmental Protection Agency Fuel Economy Site
2016 Toyota Prius Specifications Revealed
"Evaluation of the 2007 Toyota Camry Hybrid Synergy Drive system" from Oak Ridge National Laboratory has an extensive comparison between the 2004 Prius and 2007 Camry Hybrid systems

 Comparison
Toyota engines
Hybrid electric cars
Toyota